Bailey Branch is a stream in Washington County, in the U.S. state of Missouri. It is a tributary of Courtois Creek.

Bailey Branch has the name of the local Bailey family.

See also
List of rivers of Missouri

References

Rivers of Washington County, Missouri
Rivers of Missouri